Sarah Lee Wai-sze, BBS, MH (born 12 May 1987) is a Hong Kong professional track cyclist.

Her greatest success to date is winning the bronze medal in the women's keirin at the 2012 London Olympics, Hong Kong's third-ever Olympic medal and first in cycling. She won a second Olympic bronze medal in the women's sprint at the 2020 Tokyo Olympics, making her the first and only Hong Kong athlete to win medals in two different Olympic Games.

Early years
Lee was born on 12 May 1987 in Lower Ngau Tau Kok Estate, Hong Kong. She grew up in a poor family in Ngau Tau Kok, sharing a 200-square-foot public flat with her parents and two older siblings. Lee attended two schools in the locality, Bishop Paschang Catholic School and Leung Shek Chee College.

Although born with anemia, Lee represented her school in athletics in 100 and 400-metre dash. At Form 3, her school recommended her to the Hong Kong Sports Institute and her talent was spotted by the Hong Kong Cycling Association.

Career
Lee became a full-time athlete in 2004. Initially trained as a road cyclist, Lee was in danger of bowing out of cycling after a serious accident in 2006 as she swerved to avoid a stray dog during training, where she suffered a broken left scaphoid bone. Lee is coached by Jinkang Shen, who has also coached other successful Hong Kong cyclist including Kam-Po Wong.

2010
Lee captured the attention of Hong Kong when she won gold at the 500-meter time trial track cycling event at the 2010 Asian Games, in which she broke the Asian Record in winning the championship with a time of 33.945 s. Lee also won a bronze in the sprint event. In December 2010, Lee improved her Asian Record in 500-meter time trial with a time of 33.939 s in the 2010 Melbourne Track Cycling World Cup. Lee's performance has impressed the cycling hierarchy, and she received the Hong Kong Potential Sports Stars Awards for 2010. She also received the Medal of Honour from the Hong Kong Government in 2011 for her outstanding achievements in international cycling competitions.

2012
In February 2012 at the 2012 London Track Cycling World Cup, Lee upset Olympic champion Victoria Pendleton to win a bronze medal in the sprint event at the London Velodrome. She beat Pendleton 2–1 after losing to eventual champion Guo Shuang of China in the semi-finals. Lee also won a silver in the keirin final. The Union Cycliste Internationale described 24-year-old Lee as "a late revelation in the sprint events" after she claimed her second medal.

Lee was chosen as the flag bearer of the Hong Kong Olympic Representatives for the 2012 Summer Olympics in London. She won the bronze medal in women's keirin. Lee's bronze medal feat handed Hong Kong their first ever Olympic medal in cycling, and only their third overall. Lee also participated in the women's sprint event although she did not progress through the 1/8 Finals after losing to Cuba's Lisandra Guerra. Lee eventually finished at the 10th place. Lee received HK$ 750k from the Hang Seng Athlete Incentive Awards Scheme for her achievement in the Games. In an interview with Ming Pao, Lee said she hoped her achievement in the London Olympics can inspire a new generation of Hong Kong athletes for the 2016 Olympic Games. She loved cycling but she is going to retire soon.

2013
After the Olympics, Lee had a perfect start in the 2012–13 World Cup opening series with a gold medal in the women's sprint in Cali, Colombia, which is her first victory in a World Cup event. This is followed by a bronze in women's keirin in the second leg, which was held in Glasgow, Scotland. Lee won her first medal in 2013 by coming third in the women's sprint event in the third leg of the 2012–13 World Cup series.

In February 2013, Lee carried on her good form and won gold in the women's 500m time-trial at the World Track Championships in Belarus. She became the first female and third overall athlete from Hong Kong to wear rainbow jersey. After the gold, Lee beat Guo Shuang of China in Women's Sprint and won a bronze medal, securing her second medal in Minsk. This is the first time any HK athlete won multiple medals at a World Championship event.

2014
At the 2014 Asian Games, she won gold medals in Keirin and Sprint. She also won gold in at the Asian Cycling Championships for Keirin and 500m time-trial, plus a bronze in Sprint.

2016
At the 2016 Summer Olympics, in the keirin competition, she advanced to second round after coming in first in her heat. However, in the second round, she crashed after colliding with Anna Meares of Australia and could not finish the race. She was placed 7th in the competition. On the next day, despite still nursing her injuries from her crash from yesterday, she competed in the sprint competition. She won in first and second rounds but lost to Kristina Vogel of Germany in the quarterfinals. She finished 6th in this competition.

2018
Lee successfully defended her title in Keirin and 200m time-trial at the 2018 Asian Games.

2019
In 2019 UCI Track Cycling World Championships, Lee claimed gold in sprint and keirin. She became the only athlete from Hong Kong to earn multiple rainbow jerseys.

2021
At the 2020 Summer Olympics, Lee competed in both sprint and Keirin. In the keirin event, she lost in her heat in the first round but won in the repechage to advance to quarterfinals. She finished first in her quarterfinal heat to advance to the semifinals. However, she finished 5th in her heat and competed in the B Final for placement. She finished 8th overall in this event. In the sprint event, Lee advanced to 1/16 finals but lost to Katy Marchant of Great Britain to fall into the repechage. She won in the repechage and advanced to 1/8 final. She won in 1/8 final and quarterfinal. In the semifinals, she lost to Olena Starikova from Ukraine and had to race in the bronze medal match against the reigning world champion Emma Hinze of Germany. She won the bronze medal match and became the only Hong Kong Olympian with medals from different Olympic Games.

Personal life
Lee's idol is Great Britain's six-time Olympic champion Sir Chris Hoy.

Lee is a Baptist Christian. In 2009, she enrolled on a distance-learning course to study theology with the New York Theological Education Center Chinese Online School of Theology.

Achievements

2009
Asian Cycling Championships
2nd  500 m Time trial

ACC Track Asia Cup
1st  Keirin, Bangkok
1st  500 m Time trial
1st  Team Sprint (with Meng Zhao Juan)
1st  Sprint

2010
2009–2010 UCI Track Cycling World Cup Classics
3rd  Keirin, Beijing

 Asian Games
1st  10m Time
3rd  Sprint

 Asian Cycling Championships
2nd  500 m Time trial
3rd  Sprint
3rd  Team Sprint (with EXZhao Juan)

ACC Track Asia Cup
1st  500 m Time trial, Hakodate
1st  Sprint, Hakodate
2nd  Team Sprint (with Meng Zhao Juan), Hakodate
2nd  Keirin, Hakodate
1st  500 m Time trial, Kuala Lumpur
2nd  Sprint, Kuala Lumpur
2nd  Keirin, Kuala Lumpur
1st  500 m Time trial, Bangkok
2nd  Sprint, Bangkok
2nd  Keirin, Bangkok
2nd  Team Sprint (with Meng Zhao Juan), Bangkok

2011
2010–2011 UCI Track Cycling World Cup Classics
3rd  500 m Time trial,, Melbourne

Asian Cycling Championships
1st  500 m Time trial
3rd  Sprint
3rd  Team Sprint (with Meng Zhao Juan)

ACC Track Asia Cup
1st  Sprint, Bangkok
1st  Team Sprint, Bangkok (with Meng Zhao Juan)
1st  Sprint, Kuala Lumpur
1st  Keirin, Kuala Lumpur
1st  500 m Time trial, Kuala Lumpur
1st  Team Sprint (with Wang Xiao Fei), Kuala Lumpur

All China National Track Cycling Championships
3rd  Sprint
2nd  500 m Time trial

2010–11 UCI Track Cycling World Ranking
1st 500 m Time trial

2012
Olympic Games
3rd  Keirin

2011–2012 UCI Track Cycling World Cup Classics
2nd  Keirin, London
3rd  Sprint, London

Asian Cycling Championships
1st  500 m Time trial
1st  Sprint
3rd  Keirin

All China National Track Cycling Championships
2nd  Keirin
2nd  500 m Time trial
3rd  Sprint

UCI Track Cycling World Ranking
1st Sprint

2013
UCI Track World Championships
1st  500 m time trial
3rd  Sprint

2012–2013 UCI Track Cycling World Cup Classics
1st  Sprint, Cali
3rd  Keirin, Glasgow
3rd  Sprint, Aguascalientes
Overall 1st Keirin
Overall 1st Sprint

Asian Cycling Championships
1st  500 m Time trial
1st  Keirin

UCI Track Cycling World Ranking
1st Time trial
1st Keirin
2014
Asian Track Championships
1st  Keirin
1st  500m Time Trial
3rd  Sprint
Asian Games
1st  Keirin
1st  Sprint
Hong Kong International Track Cup
1st 500m Time Trial
2nd Keirin
2nd Sprint
South Australian Track Classic
1st Sprint
2nd Keirin
Incheon International Track Competition
1st Keirin
1st Sprint
Hong Kong International Track Classic
1st Keirin
1st Sprint
Hong Kong International Track Cup
1st Keirin
1st Sprint
2015
Asian Track Championships
1st  Sprint
1st  500m Time Trial
3rd  Keirin
Melbourne Cup on Wheels
1st Keirin
1st Sprint
South Australian Grand Prix
1st Sprint
2nd Keirin
Super Drome Cup
1st Keirin
1st Sprint
2016
Asian Track Championships
1st  Keirin
2nd  500m Time Trial
3rd  Sprint
ITS Melbourne DISC Grand Prix
1st Keirin
1st Sprint
ITS Melbourne Grand Prix
1st Keirin
1st Sprint
2017
Asian Track Championships
1st  Keirin
1st  Sprint
1st  500m Time Trial
2nd  Team Sprint (with Ma Wing Yu)
3rd  Sprint, World Track Championships
2021
Olympic Games
3rd  Sprint

References

External links

1987 births
Living people
Hong Kong female cyclists
Cyclists at the 2012 Summer Olympics
Cyclists at the 2016 Summer Olympics
Cyclists at the 2020 Summer Olympics
Olympic cyclists of Hong Kong
Olympic bronze medalists for Hong Kong
Olympic medalists in cycling
Medalists at the 2012 Summer Olympics
Asian Games medalists in cycling
Cyclists at the 2010 Asian Games
Cyclists at the 2014 Asian Games
Cyclists at the 2018 Asian Games
UCI Track Cycling World Champions (women)
Asian Games gold medalists for Hong Kong
Asian Games silver medalists for Hong Kong
Asian Games bronze medalists for Hong Kong
Medalists at the 2010 Asian Games
Medalists at the 2014 Asian Games
Medalists at the 2018 Asian Games
People from Kowloon
Recipients of the Bronze Bauhinia Star
Hong Kong track cyclists
Medalists at the 2020 Summer Olympics
21st-century Hong Kong women